Royal Empire Records is a subsidiary and flagship company of Royal Empire, a multimedia entertainment company based in San Diego, California.

History
Originating in Washington State during 2001 as REK Squad Entertainment, Royal Empire Records founder Edward Galloway and co-founder Mario Lyons set out on a mission to transcend to the top of the music industry.  Although the path was long and the participants in that quest have changed frequently, Edward Galloway's mission has not.  In 2003, Edward Galloway & Mario Lyons' vision of a successful record label came to life as Royal Empire Records.

The early success of Royal Empire Records through mixtapes and performances allowed the two, along with their partner Brad Johnson, to venture into other areas of entertainment.  In early 2006 the trio formed Royal Empire, LLC which serves as the parent company overseeing the business ventures.  Edward Galloway serves as Royal Empire, LLC Chairman and majority Owner.

Current status
Royal Empire, LLC CEO Brad Johnson also serves as the labels' Chief Executive Officer, providing an array of conglomerate business schemes and career decisions along with overseeing day-to-day operations of the company. Executive Vice President Kathleen Case is responsible for all show bookings and public appearances of labels talent as well as serving as artist publicist & web designers.  Executive Vice President Michael Rodriguez is the skill and craft behind production.  From video shooting, editing and mastering his craftmanship goes unnoticed.  These personnel are but a few of the powerhouse workers given credit to for the labels current success.
Although the respect and drive of the label is considered an underground hype, Royal Empire Records strives to kick down as many doors as possible to capture and maintain the respect that any other independent or major label has to this day.  Through sheer talent, will, and keen business acumen, Royal Empire Records will impact the future of Hip hop and R&B music.

Notable artists
 XXXTENTACION
 New West Era
 The Executivez
 Playa E
 R.I.O
 J'Kia
 Phenom
 Blacky
 Lady G
 8t
 600breezy

See also
 List of record labels

American independent record labels
Record labels established in 2001
Hip hop record labels